Lomo, California may refer to:
Lomo, Butte County, California
Lomo, Sutter County, California